Wilma Glacier is the western of two glaciers entering the southern part of Edward VIII Ice Shelf in Kemp Land, East Antarctica. The second, eastern glacier is Robert Glacier.

Discovery and naming
Wilma Glacier and Robert Glacier were both seen by an ANARE (Australian National Antarctic Research Expeditions) party led by Robert E. Dovers in November 1954. Dovers, accompanied by G. Schwartz, was carrying out a sledge journey and survey of Edward VIII Bay at the time. Wilma Glacier was named by Robert George Dovers for Dovers' wife. Dovers was officer in charge and surveyor at Mawson Station in 1954.

See also
 Glaciology
 Kemp Land
 List of glaciers in the Antarctic

References

External links
 Australian Antarctic Division
 Australian Antarctic Gazetteer
 Australian Antarctic Names and Medals Committee (AANMC)
 United States Geological Survey, Geographic Names Information System (GNIS)
 Scientific Committee on Antarctic Research (SCAR)
 Composite Gazetteer of Antarctica
 PDF Map of the Australian Antarctic Territory
 Mawson Station
 ANARE Club

Glaciers of Kemp Land